Elbiku is a village in Lääne-Nigula Parish, Lääne County, in western Estonia.

Before the administrative reform in 2017, the village was in Noarootsi Parish.

Main sights 
The main tourist attraction in Elbiku is Roosta Puhkeküla, a seaside recreation center. The center offers houses for rent, dining and physical activities such as bowling, disc golf and climbing in an adventure park.

Elbiku, being a coastal village, is also home to a sandy beach. The Elbiku beach is one of the most visited beaches of the Lääne-Nigula Parish, mostly due to the connection to Roosta Puhkeküla. The beach has several changing rooms, a small café and water vehicles available to rent.

References

Villages in Lääne County